Ragadia crisilda, the striped ringlet, is a species of brush-footed butterflies (family Nymphalidae).

Subspecies
Ragadia crisilda crisilda - Assam, Burma, Thailand, Indochina 
Ragadia crisilda critolina Evans, 1923 - Peninsular Malaya
Ragadia crisilda crisildina Joicey & Talbot, 1921 - Hainan 
Ragadia crisilda latifasciata Leech, 1891 - western China 
Ragadia crisilda critolaus de Nicéville, 1893 - southern Burma (Tenasserim), Thailand, Laos, Vietnam

Description
Wingspan can reach . In both males and females, the upperside of the wings is basically dusky black, with both forewings and hindwings crossed by a white discal band. Hindwings show also a curved narrow postdiscal white band. The underside of the forewings and hindwings is crossed by five white bands. Across the discal and post discal bands is present a row of black, yellow ringed ocelli, with silvery-blue centres. Forewings bear eight ocelli, while hindwings show seven ocelli.

References

External links
 Butterflies of India

Butterflies described in 1862
Ragadiini
Butterflies of Indochina